Los Beltrán (in English, "The Beltrans") was an American Spanish-language sitcom series, which aired on the U.S.-based network Telemundo from October 17, 1999 to 2001.  Although canceled after two seasons, Los Beltrán received a number of media awards. Los Beltrán was the first sitcom in two decades to deal with the Cuban American experience (following the PBS bilingual sitcom ¿Qué Pasa, USA?, which aired from 1977 to 1980) and the first-ever Spanish-language entertainment series to feature sympathetic gay characters as regulars.

Plot
The series was based broadly on the 1970s U.S. sitcom All in the Family, by Norman Lear, and on its 1960s British antecedent, Till Death Us Do Part.  The lead character, Manny Beltrán (Emiliano Díez), was an ultraconservative Cuban exile who owned a small bodega (neighborhood market) in southern California.  Manny was comically obsessed with money, and with reason: he was financially supporting not only his wife Letti (Margarita Coego) and law-student daughter Anita (played by Yeni Álvarez), but also his daughter's militantly liberal husband, Miguel Perez (Demetrius Navarro), a Chicano art student who was constantly challenging his father-in-law's prejudices and politics, while living under Manny's roof and eating his food.

Unlike the families of Archie Bunker and Alf Garnett, however, the Beltráns in the first episode are moving up from their working-class digs to a nice, middle-class duplex in Burbank, which they've bought thanks to some lottery winnings.  Upon moving in, they discover that their next-door neighbors (and holdover tenants) are a homosexual couple: a Spanish physician, Fernandito Salazar (Gabriel Romero), and his American boyfriend, Kevin Lynch (James C. Leary).  This sets up a number of plot lines through the course of the series, much as did the Jeffersons moving in next door to the Bunkers in the early days of All in the Family.

Two particular episodes, focused on Fernandito and Kevin, got the series noticed by some English-language media.  In the first season, Fernandito gets an unexpected visit from his father, a Spanish general (who resembles the late caudillo Francisco Franco), and in the end comes out to the father as gay. In the second season, Fernandito and Kevin have a commitment ceremony—shortly after Californians in real life had voted on, and passed into law, the anti-gay-marriage Proposition 22. This was the first same-sex wedding ceremony ever shown on a Spanish-language television series.

Cast
Emiliano Díez as Manny Beltrán 
Margarita Coego as Letti Beltrán
Demetrius Navarro as Miguel Perez  
Yeni Álvarez as Anita
Gabriel Romero as Fernandito Salazar
James C. Leary as Kevin Lynch

Episodes

Season 1

Season 2

Awards and recognition
Los Beltrán received the 2001 Imagen Foundation Award for Best Comedy Series and the 2001 ALMA Award from the National Council of La Raza for Best Spanish Language Comedy Series.  It was nominated for two GLAAD Media Awards, the first Spanish-language program so honored by the Gay and Lesbian Alliance Against Defamation.

External links
 Los Beltrán unofficial Web site (in English and Spanish)

Telemundo original programming
1990s American LGBT-related comedy television series
1999 American television series debuts
2001 American television series endings
1990s American sitcoms
2000s American sitcoms
Television series by Sony Pictures Television
2000s American LGBT-related comedy television series